The following is a list of cities, towns and census-designated places in New Mexico, USA, in which a majority of the population was Hispanic or Latino, according to data from the 2000 census.

Places with between 25,000 and 100,000 people
Las Cruces (51.7%)
South Valley (77.6%)

Places with between 10,000 and 25,000 people
Deming (64.6%)
Española (84.4%)
Las Vegas (83.0%)
Los Lunas (58.7%)
North Valley (56.8%)
Silver City (52.4%)
Sunland Park (96.4%)

Places with between 1,000 and 10,000 people
Agua Fria (79.2%)
Anthony (96.4%)
Bayard (84.3%)
Belen (68.6%)
Bernalillo (74.8%)
Carrizozo (53.5%)
Chama (71.2%)
Chaparral (64.5%)
Chimayo (90.8%)
Columbus (83.3%)
Dexter (71.2%)
Doña Ana (87.1%)
El Cerro Mission (73.8%)
El Valle de Arroyo Seco (70.0%)
Estancia (50.6%)
Grants (52.4%)
Hagerman (63.2%)
Hatch (79.2%)
Hurley (60.3%)
Jarales (64.6%)
La Cienega (70.8%)
La Puebla (79.9%)
Lordsburg (74.4%)
Los Chaves (54.1%)
Los Trujillos-Gabaldon (62.5%)
Loving (78.3%)
Lovington (52.1%)
Meadow Lake (57.9%)
Mesilla (52.2%)
Milan (52.3%)
Mountainair (53.1%)
Pecos (80.1%)
Peralta (51.3%)
Pojoaque (62.2%)
Questa (80.5%)
Ranchos de Taos (75.3%)
Raton (57.0%)
Santa Clara (83.5%)
Santa Rosa (81.2%)
Santa Teresa (55.6%)
Socorro (54.5%)
Springer (70.0%)
Taos (54.3%)
Tome-Adelino (63.4%)
Tucumcari (51.4%)
Tularosa (56.1%)
Vado (95.0%)

Places with fewer than 1,000 people
Alcalde (89.1%)
Algodones (73.4%)
Carnuel (51.1%)
Casa Colorada (73.2%)
Chamisal (92.0%)
Chilili (92.0%)
Cimarron (58.9%)
Cuartelez (86.1%)
Cuba (60.3%)
Cundiyo (87.4%)
Cuyamungue (83.4%)
El Rancho (70.3%)
Encino (80.9%)
Glorieta (56.0%)
Jaconita (63.0%)
La Jara (79.4%)
Lake Arthur (70.1%)
Los Cerrillos (50.7%)
 Magdalena (51.6%)
Manzano (87.0%)
Maxwell (55.5%)
Mesquite (94.8%)
Mosquero (77.5%)
Pena Blanca (79.4%)
Penasco (91.3%)
Ponderosa (64.5%)
Rincon (87.3%)
Rio Chiquito (90.3%)
Rio Lucio (93.4%)
Roy (52.6%)
Salem (94.1%)
Santa Cruz (91.7%)
San Ysidro (71.8%)
Sombrillo (50.3%)
Tajique (79.1%)
Tijeras (56.3%)
Torreon (68.9%)
Vadito (93.1%)
Vaughn (87.0%)
Wagon Mound (87.8%)
Willard (83.3%)

See also
 List of U.S. communities with Hispanic majority populations

Hispanic